Lieutenant-Commander Greville Reginald Charles Howard (7 September 1909 – 20 September 1987) was a British Conservative and National Liberal politician.

Howard was a younger son of Henry Howard, 19th Earl of Suffolk, by his wife Margaret (née Leiter).  Charles Howard, 20th Earl of Suffolk, was his elder brother.

Howard was a member of Westminster City Council, and served as Mayor of Westminster from 1946 to 1947.  He served as Member of Parliament (MP) for St Ives from 1950 until he stood down at the 1966 general election.

Howard married Mary, daughter of William Smith Ridehalgh, in 1945. He died in September 1987, aged 78.

References 

 

1909 births
1987 deaths
Younger sons of earls
English people of American descent
English people of Swiss descent
Greville Howard
Conservative Party (UK) MPs for English constituencies
Members of the Parliament of the United Kingdom for St Ives
UK MPs 1950–1951
UK MPs 1951–1955
UK MPs 1955–1959
UK MPs 1959–1964
UK MPs 1964–1966
Mayors of places in Greater London
Members of Westminster Metropolitan Borough Council